Sergey Darkin may refer to:
Sergey Mikhaylovich Darkin (born 1963), Russian politician
Sergey Darkin (speedway rider) (born 1973), Russian motorcycle speedway rider